Chesias isabella is a moth of the family Geometridae. It was described by Schawerda in 1915. It is found in France, Spain and Portugal.

There is one generation per year with adults on wing from May to July.

References

External links

Lepiforum.de

isabella
Moths described in 1915
Moths of Europe